Miracle Mile is the fourth studio album by American indie rock band Strfkr, released on February 19, 2013, by Polyvinyl Records.

Track listing

Charts

References

2013 albums
Polyvinyl Record Co. albums
STRFKR albums